Nike Instructs the Boy in Heroic History (German: Nike lehrt den Knaben Heldensagen) is an outdoor sculpture by Emil Wolff, installed on Schlossbrücke in Berlin, Germany.

References

External links

 

Nude sculptures in Germany
Outdoor sculptures in Berlin
Sculptures of children
Sculptures of Nike
Sculptures of women in Germany
Statues in Germany